Haldwani (Kumaoni: Haldvānī) is the largest city of Kumaon. It is also the third most populous city and largest commercial market in the Indian state of Uttarakhand. Haldwani is said to be the financial capital of Uttarakhand, having the most commercial, economic and industrial activities of the state. Haldwani is located in the Nainital District, and is one of its eight Subdivisions. The Haldwani Urban agglomeration has 232,060 people as of 2011, and is the third  most populous UA in Uttarakhand, after Dehradun and Haridwar. Being situated in the immediate foothills of Kumaon Himalayas, the Kathgodam neighbourhood of Haldwani is known as the "Gateway to Kumaon".

Located in the Bhabhar region in the Himalayan foothills on the banks of the Gaula River, the town of Haldwani was established in 1834, as a mart for hill people who visited Bhabar during the cold season. The establishment of the Bareilly–Nainital provincial road in 1882 and the Bhojeepura–Kathgodam railway line by Rohilkund and Kumaon Railway in 1884 helped develop the town into a major trading post and then a hub between the hilly regions of Kumaon and the Indo-Gangetic Plains.

Etymology
The name "Haldwani" is an anglicised version of the Kumaoni word "Haldu-vani" (literally "forest of Haldu"), named after the tree of "Haldu" (Kadamb), known to botanists as Haldina cordifolia. The Haldu trees were found in abundance around the city prior to deforestation of the region for agriculture and settlement. The place was regionally known as Halduvani until George William Traill took over as Commissioner of Kumaon and renamed it to Haldwani in 1834.

History
The Bhabhar region, where the city is located, has historically been a part of the Kingdom of Kumaon. The region came under the dominion of Kumaon, when King Gyan Chand of Chand Dynasty visited Delhi Sultanate in the 14th century. Later, the Mughals tried to take over the hills, but their attempts received a setback due to the difficult terrain.

In the early 1600s, the Haldwani region was sparsely populated. It was inhabited by people of a Native tribe known as the Buksa. The Terai area southward consisted of thick forests, and was used as hunting grounds by the Mughals.

Founding and 19th century

In 1816, after the British defeated Gorkhas, and gained control of Kumaon by the Treaty of Sugauli, Gardner was appointed the Commissioner of Kumaon. Later George William Traill took over as Commissioner and renamed Halduvani as Haldwani in 1834. Though British records suggest that the place was established in 1834, as a mart for hill people who visited the Bhabhar (Himalayan foothills) region, during the cold season. The township, formerly located in Mota Haldu, had only thatched houses. Brick-houses began to be built only after 1850. The first English middle school was established in 1831.

During the Indian Rebellion of 1857, Haldwani was briefly seized by the rebels of Rohilkhand, soon martial law was declared in the region by Sir Henry Ramsay (the Commissioner of Kumaon), and by 1858, the region was cleared of the rebels. The Rohillas, who were accused of attacking Haldwani, were hanged by the British at Phansi Gadhera in Nainital. Later, Ramsay connected Nainital with Kathgodam by road in 1882. In 1883–84, the railway track was laid between Bareilly and Kathgodam. The first train arrived at Haldwani from Lucknow on 24 April 1884.

Before the formation of Nainital district in 1891, it was part of the Kumaon district, which was later renamed Almora district. The Town Act was implemented here in 1885 and Haldwani was declared a municipality on 1 February 1897. The Tehsil office was opened here in 1899, when it became the tehsil headquarters of the Bhabhar, one of four divisions of the Nainital district, and included 4 towns and 511 villages; and had a combined population of 93,445 (1901), spread over 1,279 sq. miles.

20th and 21st centuries

In 1901, with a population of 6,624, Haldwani was the headquarters of the Bhabhar region of Nainital District, in the United Provinces of Agra and Oudh, and it also used to become the winter headquarters of the officers of the Kumaon Division and the Nainital District. The Arya Samaj Bhavan was built in 1901 and Sanatan Dharm Sabha in 1902. The Municipality of Haldwani was disestablished in 1904, and Haldwani was constituted as a Notified area. The first Hospital of the city was opened in 1912.

Haldwani hosted the second session of the Kumaon Parishad in 1918. Protests against the Rowlatt Act and for Coolie-Begar Abolition were held all over the city in 1920 under the leadership of Pt. Tara Datt Gairola Raibahadur. Many processions were carried out in the city between 1930 and 1934 during the Civil disobedience movement. In 1940, at the Haldwani conference, Badri Datt Pandey voiced for granting special status to the mountainous regions of Kumaon in the United Provinces, thus, giving a way to the future Uttarakhand movement.

Haldwani was a mid-sized town, with a population of about 25,000, in 1947, when India became Independent from the British Rule. Haldwani became a part of the Indian state of Uttar Pradesh. The city was electrified in 1950. The 2nd battalion of the Naga Regiment, affectionately known as Head Hunters, was raised at Haldwani on 11 February 1985. Haldwani played a major role in the Uttarakhand movement. The town was spearheading the agitation, which often ended up in violence and also in police firing and brutality.

Forty human skeletons and 300 'grave-like structures' were discovered in Haldwani's Golapar area on 9 May 2017 during the construction of the Haldwani ISBT. The skeletons were speculated to be the remains of the Rohilla chieftains from Bareilly who fought against the British in 1857 and were killed by the British army or of those who died of epidemics, malaria or famine. However, forensic tests later revealed the skeletons to be only two years old.

Geography

Topography

Geologically, Haldwani is settled on a piedmont grade (called Bhabhar) where the mountain rivers go underground to re-emerge in the Indo-Gangetic plain. The Haldwani Bhabhar stretches horizontally, surrounded by the regions of Ramnagar and Tanakpur and lies between the Shivalik hills to the north and the Terai region of Rudrapur to the south. According to the Bureau of Indian Standards, Haldwani falls under seismic zone 4, in a scale of 2 to 5 (in order of increasing vulnerability to earthquakes).

The Haldwani tehsil  has an area of 958.6 square k.m, including both flat and hilly ground, and is in the Indian Standard Time Zone (UTC−5:30). When Haldwani was founded in 1837, most of the early buildings were around Mota Haldu. The city gradually developed northwards towards the present Bazaar and Railway Station. The city had in the past seen haphazard development due to the absence of a development authority. Dozens of colonies were set up in the early 2000s without any regulation with narrow roads, making commuting a nightmare. The city ranked 395 in the Swachh Survekshan 2017, out of 434 cities, with a total score of 557.

Metropolitan area

Haldwani is the principal city in the Haldwani Urban Agglomeration Area, situated in the southeastern part of Uttarakhand, in the Kumaon region. Apart from the towns of Haldwani and Kathgodam, the Urban Agglomeration of Haldwani also includes eleven outgrowths (judge farm, Damua Dhunga Bandobasti, Byura, Bamori Talli Bandobasti, Amrawati Colony, Shakti Vihar, Bhatt Colony, Manpur Uttar, Haripur Sukha, Gaujajali Uttar, Kusumkhera, Bithoria No. 1, Korta, Bamori Malli and Bamori Talli Kham) and two census towns (Mukhani and Haldwani Talli).

Haldwani is also a tehsil, one of the eight subdivisions of the Nainital district. The tehsil of Haldwani is situated in the southern part of the Nainital district and shares its borders with the tehsils of Nainital, Kaladhungi, Lalkuan and Dhari tehsils in Nainital district; Gadarpur, Kiccha and Sitarganj in Udham Singh Nagar district and the tehsil of Poornagiri in Champawat district. The tehsil comprises four towns and 202 villages.

Climate

Demographics

The municipality of Haldwani has a population of 156,060 people. The region is dominated by the native Kumaonis and migrants of various states including Uttar Pradesh, Bihar, Punjab, Bengal, hence a major population belonging to various religions and regions are present in haldwani as per provisional data released by the 2011 census. The 2017 estimate, on the other hand, predicted a population of 291,338. The population of the municipality area, combined with outgrowths was 201,461, and the urban agglomeration of Haldwani-cum-Kathgodam had a population of 232,060, out of which males were 121,409 and females were 110,686.

Hinduism is the majority religion in Haldwani with 57.84% followers. Islam is second most popular religion in city with approximately 41.89% following it. In Haldwani, Christianity is followed by 0.89%, Sikhism by 2.19%, Jainism by 0.09%,and Buddhism by 0.09%. Around 0.01% stated 'Other Religion', approximately 0.07% stated 'No Particular Religion'.

Education

As of 2011, Haldwani has a total of 198 Government financed educational institutions, including 73 Primary Schools, 25 middle schools, 25 secondary schools and 25 senior secondary schools. Besides these, there are several institutions of higher education, including 2-degree colleges affiliated with the Kumaun University, Nainital and a medical college affiliated with the Hemwati Nandan Bahuguna Uttarakhand Medical Education University, Dehradun. The Government Medical College, Haldwani was established in 1997 as Uttarakhand Forest Hospital Trust Medical College, and is a residential & co-educational college recognised by the Medical Council of India and Government of India.

The Defence Institute of Bio-Energy Research (DIBER), an Indian defence laboratory of the Defence Research and Development Organisation (DRDO), is also located in Haldwani. It conducts research and development of bioenergy as well as the sustainable and eco-friendly high altitude agro-technologies in the Indian Himalayan Region for the use of Indian Military.

Amrapali Group of Institutes is located in Lamachaur area of Haldwani. It was established in 1999 and is currently running Engineering, Hotel Management, Computer Applications, Pharmacy, Education, Commerce and Business Management Courses. 

The Graphic Era University Campus is situated in the Gola Par area of Haldwani which is a special class private university.

Haldwani is home to the Uttarakhand Open University, which was established by an act of Uttarakhand Legislative Assembly on 31 October 2005. The university, located in Teenpani neighbourhood of the city, is the only open university in the state. More than 140 courses are available at the university; prominent ones being journalism and mass communication, hotel management, tourism management, business management, education,  and other traditional courses.

Pal College of Technology & Management is situated in Haldwani in Uttarakhand state of India. it is accredited from Other and it is affiliated to Kumaun University. PAL COLLEGE, Haldwani offers 8 courses across 6 streams namely Science, IT, Management, Education, Hotel Management, Arts and across 7 degrees like BSc, BHM, B.Ed, BBA, BCA.Hostel facility is not available for its students. Additional campus facilities such as Math Lab, Boys Hostel, Computer Lab, Library, Cls. Room, Placement, Sports, Trans., WiFi are also there.

Economy
Well connected with the Indo-Gangetic plain by road (to New Delhi, Dehradun and Lucknow) and rail (New Delhi, DehraDun, Lucknow and Kolkata), Haldwani is an important commercial hub. It is home to one of the largest vegetable, fruit and foodgrain markets in north India.Being the gateway to most of Kumaon, it is an important revenue center of Uttarakhand based on its advantageous location as a base depot for goods in transit to the hills. The Gaula river is exploited for a large quantity of boulders, sand and gravels every year, and forms an important revenue source for both the government and local business.

Business in Haldwani
The status of Haldwani is as an economic hub can be seen in the several business outlets that run purely on trade. Whether it is perishable commodities or non-perishable ones the traders of Haldwani stock and distribute their goods all over the hilly regions. The entire hill region is dependent upon the material and supplies that are stocked and then passed on to other hill town and settlements. Naturally occurring products like organic grains, herbal, horticulture produce and other environment-friendly handicrafts would all attract revenue for the investor, the traders as also the government. Besides these, the agricultural and pharmaceutical products sector would be a great draw for the investor, industrialists, entrepreneur, business people as well as retailers and distributors. The traditional and the modern – both junction of the hills and the plains.

Investment in Haldwani
Already a major revenue earner for the state of Uttarakhand, tourism has much more scope for Haldwani and nearby locations. The concept of rural tourism is fast catching up where the tourists prefer staying with the local population rather than in hotels and resorts. The comforts of home, a taste of the local cuisine as well as spending time exploring the nooks and crannies of an old world, charming hill town – all these afford the tourist with a tremendously different experience. Beside such opportunities, there are several more ways in which the tourist potential can be explored and maximized for its optimal output to help the township progress and blossom to its zenith. Businessmen, investors, resort owners as also the local community can capitalize on these fresher opportunities.

There are also several openings for other business enterprises like construction material, adventure equipment, floriculture as well as medical tourism in the lap of nature. It would also prove to have great scope for all forms of educational and training institutions that would be rooted in the ancient teaching of the Gurukul system. Therefore, it would be a wise move to visit the Haldwani region and explore its vast investment potential for the future.

Government and politics

Civic Administration
Haldwani is a municipal corporation governed by a mayor–council system. The municipal area is divided into 60 territorial constituencies known as wards. The Municipal Corporation is made up of a Wards Committee, where each ward has one seat. Members, known as Councillors, are elected to the Wards Committee on the basis of adult franchise for a term of five years, as provisioned by the 74th Amendment of the Indian Constitution relating to urban local governments. The 'Nagar Nigam Haldwani' is a unicameral legislative body, comprising sixty Councillors, and the Mayor. In addition to the elected Councillors, the committee also includes fifteen councillors nominated by the state government and four additional members; the three MLAs and MP from the city.

The Town Act was implemented in Haldwani in 1885 after which, it was declared a municipality on 1 February 1897. The Municipality of Haldwani was soon disestablished and Haldwani was constituted as a 'notified area' in 1904. In 1907, it got the status of town area. The Haldwani-Kathgodam Municipal Council was established on 21 September 1942, and was upgraded to a Municipal corporation on 21 May 2011. Currently it is the third largest Municipal Corporation in the state of Uttarakhand after Dehradun and Haridwar

Politics
The city is represented in the Lok Sabha by a representative elected from the Nainital-Udhamsingh Nagar Constituency. Ajay Bhatt, from BJP, is the current Member of Parliament from Nainital-Udhamsingh Nagar. He won the 2019 Lok Sabha elections by 339,000 votes against Harish Rawat from the Congress, . The Current MLA is Sumit Hriyesh who is from the COngress Party and was previously held by the Leader of Opposition and very Senior Legislator Late Dr Indira Hridayesh who is widely acknowledged to have developed the face of modern Haldwani which she has represented 3 times since the formation of Uttarakhand .at. Generally considered a Congress Stronghold, the Congress has registered a victory from Nainital-Udham Singh Nagar eight times since 1951. While BJP won this seat two times, other political parties had managed three victories. The city elects three members to the Uttarakhand Legislative Assembly. Much of the city forms part of the Haldwani assembly constituency, Nagar Nigam ward no 1 to 37, although some western and southern suburbs are a part of the Kaladhungi (ward no. 38 to 55) and Lalkuan (ward no. 56 to 60) constituencies respectively.

Transport

Haldwani is known as the Gateway to Kumaon. The most commonly used forms of transport in Haldwani include government owned services such as railways and buses. Complementing these government services are bus routes operated by KMOU (Kumaon Motor Owner's Union), as well as privately operated taxis and auto rickshaws.

Road
NH 109 cuts through Haldwani; other major roads are the Bareilly-Bageshwar highway, Rampur Road, Haldwani-Kaladhungi–Ramnagar Road and the Kathgodam-Sitarganj Road. Haldwani is well connected to the country's capital Delhi via buses run by Uttarakhand Transport Corporation. All the buses leave from the Haldwani Bus Station for Delhi's Anand Vihar ISBT. The connectivity to state capital Dehradun is also good. There are a number of buses for Dehradun-Haldwani route. Apart from Delhi and Dehradun, regular buses are available for several hill cities like Nainital, Almora, Ranikhet, Bageshwar and Pithoragarh.

A new ISBT is under construction in the Gaulapar region. The ISBT would be spread over 8 Acres, and has been termed the 'Largest ISBT in north India' by The Times of India. The foundation stone was laid in 2016. The construction work started in 2014, but was halted in May 2017, when a large number of human skeletons were discovered at the construction site by workers.

Rail

There are direct rail links to many parts both in and outside the state to all major junctions. In 1883–84, the railway track was laid between Bareilly and Kathgodam. The first train arrived at Haldwani from Lucknow on 24 April 1884. Later, the railway line was extended to Kathgodam. Indian Railways is planning shorter rail track via Ramnagar–Kotdwar–Haridwar instead of the present track via Rampur–Moradabad.

Air
The air gateway to Haldwani is the Pantnagar Airport located at Pantnagar, which is about 28 km (17 mi) south of Haldwani city, and handles the domestic flights. The Pantnagar Airport provides direct connectivity to New Delhi, the Capital of India.
Government has approved Hindon Airport to operate as civil Terminal. From October 2019 people of Uttarakhand can fly to Pithoragarh from Hindon Airport located in Ghaziabad. Hindon Airport is only 4 km away from East Delhi. The new civil terminal is proposed to operate flights to eight routes, including Nasik, Pithoragarh, Kannur, Hubli, Faizabad, Shimla, Jamnagar and Kalaburgi.

Sports

Indira Gandhi International Sports Stadium is located in Haldwani. The stadium, having a capacity of 25000 people, was inaugurated on 18 December 2016 by Harish Rawat, the then Chief Minister of Uttarakhand. It is spread over an area of 70 acres and has cricket and football grounds, a track for 800-metre race, a hockey field, badminton courts, a lawn tennis court, a boxing ring, and a swimming pool.

Haldwani hosted a state-level football championship, and the first edition of CWE (Continental Wrestling Entertainment) pro-wrestling series, in 2016. Haldwani will be the second city after Delhi in northern India to have more than one international stadium. The Uttarakhand State Football Association has its headquarters in Haldwani.

Media and communications
Haldwani, along with other areas of the Kumaon division, is served by the Almora station of the All India Radio. The first relay centre of Akashwani FM will be set up in Haldwani city on 1,560 sqm of land. The relay centre will broadcast FM radio programmes of the All India Radio round the clock within a range of 70 km. Internet Services are provided by BSNL, Vodafone, Bharti Airtel, Idea Cellular and Reliance jio.
Hello Haldwani community radio broadcasts programmes on education, agriculture, health and local traditions from the campus of Uttarakhand Open University, Haldwani.

Local attractions

Haldwani is a hidden paradise of Uttarakhand. Here are the best places you can explore in this otherwise undiscovered part of the mountainous state of India:

Kathgodam
In Kumaoni, Kathgodam stands for timber depot. Kathgodam may be a railway station for most tourists traveling on to other destinations, but it has an interesting history. Direct trains from cities such as Delhi, Kolkata, Jammu Tawi, Kanpur and Jaisalmer to Kathgodam provide access to travelers to the Kumaon Himalayas.

Devbhoomi Adventureland 
looking for some fun places to see in Haldwani then you must explore Devbhoomi Adventureland. It is a perfect place to have a fun day trip with your families and friends. You can opt for the many adventurous rides.

Sanjay Van
Forming a part of the Tanda Region, Sanjay Van is nothing less than a paradise for nature lovers. Surrounded by thousands of trees and foliage, Sanjay Van is the best place to visit in Haldwani for a picnic with the family.

References

External links
Haldwani city guide
Haldwani city guide

 
Cities and towns in Nainital district
Tourism in Uttarakhand
Cities in Uttarakhand